The Elgin Burghs by-election was a Parliamentary by-election held on 8 September 1905. The constituency returned one Member of Parliament (MP) to the House of Commons of the United Kingdom, elected by the first past the post voting system.

Vacancy
Alexander Asher had been Liberal MP for the seat of Elgin Burghs since the 1881 Elgin Burghs by-election. He died on 5 August 1905, causing a by-election.

Electoral history
The seat had been Liberal since the party was founded in 1859. They easily held the seat at the last election, with a comfortable majority;

Candidates
On 17 August the local Liberal Association selected 51-year-old John Sutherland as their candidate to defend the seat. He had not stood for Parliament before. He was born in nearby Lossiemouth. He was educated at Aberdeen University. He was a partner in the firm of J & P Sutherland, fish curers of Portsoy.
The local Conservative Association selected 52-year-old Patrick Rose-Innes as their candidate to gain the seat. He also had not stood for Parliament before. He was born in Aberdeenshire and educated at Aberdeen University. He had been a barrister since 1878.

Campaign
Polling day was fixed for 8 September 1905, 34 days after the death of the previous MP.

Result
There was a large swing of over 11% to the Liberals who comfortably held the seat:

The result was the biggest victory that the Liberals had ever had in the constituency.

Aftermath
Sutherland was re-elected at the following General Election. The result was:

Rose-Innes was not his opponent and instead contested West Lothian in 1906, the 1907 Jarrow by-election and Middleton in 1910 without success. Sutherland remained as the MP until his death in 1918.

References

1905 in Scotland
1905 elections in the United Kingdom
1900s elections in Scotland
By-elections to the Parliament of the United Kingdom in Scottish constituencies
Politics of Moray
Elgin Burghs